Acanthopleura echinata is a Southeast Pacific species of edible chiton, a marine polyplacophoran mollusc in the family Chitonidae, the typical chitons.

Description
In Chile, the largest individuals are in the north and the smallest in the south. The species is very dark reddish-brown. The plated shell, which often is covered in epibionts like algae, Scurria limpets and Mytilus mussels, has many spines. The similar-sized Enoplochiton niger of the same region lacks the spines.

Distribution, habitat and behavior
The distribution of Chiton magnificus ranges along the Pacific coast of South America from Concepción Province (Punta Tumbes) in Chile to Talara in Peru. Although there are old claimed records of this species from the Galápagos Islands, these are considered incorrect.

It inhabits rocky coasts in areas that often have heavy surf. Its habitat often has giant kelp Lessonia nigrescens. It is generally quite common, with average densities in appropriate habitat typically being from about 1.5 individuals per square meter to 2.5 per square meter.

The species is omnivorous, feeding on a wide range of algae and invertebrates. It has radular teeth that are quite large, allowing it to eat heavily incrusted things like coralline algae.

Human use
Neither of these have large spines.

References

Chitonidae
Edible molluscs
Western South American coastal fauna
Molluscs of South America
Molluscs described in 1824